FreeX GmbH (usually styled freeX) was a German aircraft manufacturer based in Lenggries and previously located in Egling. The company specialized in the design and manufacture of paragliders in the form of ready-to-fly aircraft.

The company was founded about 1994 and seems to gone out of business in about 2013.

FreeX was a Gesellschaft mit beschränkter Haftung, a limited liability company.

The company produced a wide range of paragliders, including the competition Arrow, intermediate Blade, Moon and Blast, the mountaineering descent FXT wing, the two-place Gemini and the beginner Joker.

Aircraft 

Summary of aircraft built by FreeX:
FreeX Arrow
FreeX Blade
FreeX Blast
FreeX Flair
FreeX FXT
FreeX Gemini
FreeX Joker
FreeX Mission
FreeX Moon
FreeX Oxygen
FreeX Pure
Freex Stereo
FreeX Sun

References

External links

Company website archives on Archive.org

Defunct aircraft manufacturers of Germany
Paragliders
German companies established in 1994